Statistics of Division 2 for the 1926–27 season.

League standings

Division 2 Uppsvenska Serien 1926–27 
Teams from a large part of northern Sweden, approximately above the province of Medelpad, were not allowed to play in the national league system until the 1953–54 season, and a championship was instead played to decide the best team in Norrland.

No teams from Uppsvenska Serien were allowed to be promoted to Allsvenskan, due to both geographic and economic reasons.

Division 2 Mellansvenska Serien 1926–27

Division 2 Östsvenska Serien 1926–27

Division 2 Västsvenska Serien 1926–27

Division 2 Sydsvenska Serien 1926–27

References
Sweden - List of final tables (Clas Glenning)

Swedish Football Division 2 seasons
2
Sweden